Alberto Canal (born 12 October, 1961) is a Spanish water polo player. He placed fourth in the men's tournament at the 1984 Summer Olympics.

References

External links
 

1961 births
Living people
Spanish male water polo players
Olympic water polo players of Spain
Water polo players at the 1984 Summer Olympics
Water polo players from Barcelona
20th-century Spanish people